Chemfluence is a national level technical symposium of Department of Chemical Engineering, A C College of Technology, Anna University, India.  Started in 1994 as a college level symposium, it is now in its 24th year. Paper presentations, poster presentations, guest lectures, workshops and events form an integral part of the symposium.  The symposium mainly aims at nourishing budding chemical engineers with knowledge of core concepts and providing an opportunity to showcase their talents. With more than 20 events across 5 days, it is one of the most prestigious tech events of South India. It is also one of the very few symposiums in India to host a cultural fest in association with university departments. Chemfluence is conducted annually by Consortium of Chemical Technologists, the official student body of Department of Chemical Engineering, Anna University.

About

Chemfluence, is a national level technical symposium ( Technical and Cultural Events ) organized annually by the Department of Chemical Engineering, A.C.Tech, Anna University every year since 1994.

With an array of events spread across three days it seeks to provide a platform for dextrous Chemical Engineers across the nation to show off their technical powers and develop their full intellectual potential.

With innovation as inspiration and technical knowledge as a tool, Chemfluence aims at bringing a complete transformation to the very grassroots of the field. Chemfluence gives an opportunity for engineering students to look beyond their course and curriculum, to roll back their sleeves, with the technical wand in their hands and do some real magic.

History

Chemfluence was started in the year 1994 by the students of The Department of Chemical Engineering, A.C.Tech, Anna University. Since then Chemfluence had been a massive success and been attracting more participants and has become a phenomenal hit among the events by other Chemical Engineers around the country.

Chemfluence 2013

Chemfluence for the academic year 2012-2013 was conducted by Department of Chemical Engineering, from 27 February 2013 to Friday, 1 March 2013.

Some of the major events conducted this year have been

 Paper Presentation
 Poster Presentation
 Live Model
 Contraption
 Math Modelling
 Monetarist

Chemfluence 2014

Chemfluence 2014 was a six-day technical extravaganza organised by the students of Department of Chemical Engineering from 25 February 2014 to 3 March 2014 under the theme of Energy and Environment. Several Workshops and Guest lectures were conducted to impart practical and technical knowledge to the budding Engineers. A National Conference on Energy and Environment, EECON'14 was conducted as a part of Chemfluence'14 3 March 2014.

Workshops

Acknowledging the mindset of budding engineers to assimilate concepts in a practical way, Chemfluence'14 gave several Workshops like
 Programmable Logic Controllers
 Industrial Safety & Risk Analysis
 Statistical Tools for Researchers & Engineers
 Instrumental Methods of Analysis
 Computational Fluid Dynamics
 MATLAB

EECON'14

As part of Chemfluence'14, the final day of the symposium was reserved for EECON'14 - the first National Conference on Energy & Environment. Being the first ever symposium to be organised in the university by the student fraternity, the conference begun with the EECON'14 souvenir release and a keynote address by Dr. G. Sekaran, Chief Scientist, CLRI  on handling wastes in the tanning sector at the Colin Mckenzie Auditorium. Subsequently, six paper presentation sessions and a poster presentation session were held on a plethora of topics such as Solid Waste Management, Air Pollution Control and Modeling of Environmentally benign processes. Chairpersons for the sessions were personalities high on caliber including Dr. T. Renganathan, Assistant Professor, IIT- Madras, Dr. S. Kanmani, Director, CTDT, Anna University and Dr. M. K. Gowthaman, CLRI amongst many others.

Chemfluence 2016

Chemfluence for the academic year 2015-2016 was held from 18 March 2016 to 22 March 2016 based on the theme of waste management. GMW 2k16, A national conference on Global Management of Waste will be conducted by the organizing committee consisting of the Students and Faculties of Department of Chemical Engineering. Today's industries are in need of innovative ideas and cost cutting techniques to increase the demands for their products in the highly competitive global market with fast depleting resources. Waste management is one of the most serious concerns in industries which needs to be tackled with highly efficient and out-of-the-box ideas that revamp the whole scenario, thus in a way, Transforming Waste into Wealth. With this in concern, Chemfluence ’16 has a theme of Waste Management. This year the Consortium of Chemical Technologists has planned to conduct
 An educational fair
 An alumni meet
 Guest lectures and workshops
 National Conference - Global Management of Waste' (GMW 2k16)'

Conference On Global Management of Waste, 'GMW 2k16'
GMW 2k16 is the national conference on Global Management of Waste 2016. It is a nationwide congregation of engineering graduates, research scholars and professionals to deal with waste management. The aim of the conference is to generate new perspectives on ways to handle waste. Waste generation is a pressing issue. In India, 94% of waste is being dumped on land. Waste includes Municipal, Agricultural, Industrial, Electronic, Fuel Waste and Land waste. Energy can also be generated from waste. Though methods such as conversion of waste water to ethanol and Vermicomposting are available, a large scale, cost effective and feasible solution is very much required. And this is exactly what we hope to achieve through GMW 2k16. 
GMW 2k16 will provide a unique stage for establishing new waste management related technologies that would "Reform Refuse to Riches". This year, for the first time in India, video presentation will be conducted instead of the usual Poster Presentation. It is a common occurrence in International Conferences and GMW 2k16 will follow the suit.

Topics
Solid waste management
Waste to energy
Bioremediation of waste
Wastewater treatment and reclamation

External links
 Department of Chemical Engineering
 Anna University
 Chemfluence FB

Anna University
Chemical engineering organizations
Organizations established in 1994
1994 establishments in Tamil Nadu